Milton Richard Simington (August 26, 1918 January 17, 1943) was an American football guard who played two seasons in the National Football League (NFL) for the Cleveland Rams and Pittsburgh Steelers. He was selected to the NFL All-Star team in 1942.

Playing career
Simington played college football at the University of Arkansas before being selected by the Cleveland Rams in the 1941 NFL Draft. In August 1942, he was traded along with Johnny Binotto by the Rams to the Pittsburgh Steelers in exchange for George Platukis.

Simington was selected for the NFL All-Star team based on his performance during the 1942 NFL season, but he suffered a mild heart attack during practices for the game which ended his playing career. He suffered a second heart attack a few weeks later which proved fatal; he died in Shreveport, Louisiana, on January 17, 1943, at the age of 24. At the time of his death he had been planning to enter officer training school.

References

1918 births
1943 deaths
People from McCurtain County, Oklahoma
Players of American football from Oklahoma
American football offensive guards
American football placekickers
Arkansas Razorbacks football players
Cleveland Rams players
Pittsburgh Steelers players
People from Dierks, Arkansas